The 2001 Illinois State Redbirds football team represented Illinois State University as a member of the Gateway Football Conference during the 2001 NCAA Division I-AA football season. The team was led by second-year head coach Denver Johnson and played their home games at Hancock Stadium in Normal, Illinois. The Redbirds finished the season with an overall record of 2–9 and a record of 2–5 in conference play, tying for sixth place in the Gateway.

Schedule

References

Illinois State
Illinois State Redbirds football seasons
Illinois State Redbirds football